Adrian is an unincorporated community on W County Road 59 in Big Spring township, in southwestern Seneca County, Ohio, United States, roughly three miles (five kilometres) south-southeast of Frenchtown.

History
Adrian was originally called Oregon, and under the latter name was laid out in 1844. A post office called Adrian has been in operation since 1853.

Notable person
Darius D. Hare, politician

References

Unincorporated communities in Seneca County, Ohio
Unincorporated communities in Ohio